State Route 65 (SR-65) is a  state highway in northern Utah. It connects Interstate 80 (I-80) near the Mountain Dell Dam to I-84 in Henefer.

Route description

From its southern terminus east of Salt Lake City and west of Park City, the highway goes north, crossing the Mountain Dell Golf Course. It partially circumnavigates the Little Dell Reservoir before it makes another turn for the north. Right before the Morgan County line the route turns northwest. When it reaches East Canyon State Park, SR-65 heads north-northwest, continuing this general direction until its northern terminus in Henefer.

History

State Route 65 was added to the state highway system in 1931, following the historic Mormon Trail as closely as practicable from SR-5 (US-30S, now I-84) in Henefer over Big Mountain Pass and through Emigration Canyon to Salt Lake City (later meeting SR-186 there). The portion of SR-65 east of Mountain Dell was removed from the route in 1945 in favor of a connection with SR-4 (US-40, now I-80) in Parley's Canyon. (The connecting SR-66 was truncated at the same time, and has since been reconnected.) Two years later, this law was essentially repealed, as SR-65 was moved back to the full Henefer-Salt Lake City route; the connection to SR-4 became a new State Route 239. Roads within This Is The Place Monument near the west end were also added to the route for the state to maintain. The state legislature removed the western portion in 1969, rerouting SR-65 to its current alignment between I-80 in Parley's Canyon and I-84 in Henefer and replacing SR-239. However, at the same time, SR-3 (which had replaced SR-5) was moved to I-84, and the old route through Henefer became an extension of SR-65 - in both directions. The western connection to I-84 was renumbered State Route 86 in 1975.

Major intersections

References

External links

065
 065
 065
 065
Utah State Route 065